Chicken is a tiny unincorporated village in Southeast Fairbanks Census Area, Alaska. It is a community founded on gold mining, and is one of the few surviving gold rush towns in Alaska. The population was 12 at the time of the 2020 census, up from 7 in 2010. However, usually year round, there are 17 inhabitants: due to mining, Chicken's population peaks during the summer. It has frequently been noted on lists of unusual place names. 
There is a cafe with gas station, a small hotel, an RV park, a small general store and a saloon located at Chicken.

History
Chicken was settled by gold miners in the late 19th century. In 1902 the local post office was established, requiring a community name. Due to the prevalence of ptarmigan in the area, that name was suggested as the official name for the new community. However, the spelling could not be agreed on, and "Chicken" was used to avoid embarrassment. 
A portion of Chicken, with buildings from the early 1900s and the F.E. Company Dredge No. 4 (Pedro Dredge), is listed on the National Register of Historic Places as the Chicken Historic District. Chicken is the outpost for the 40 Mile mining district. There are still active gold mines and inactive gold dredges in this area. Enough gold was mined here to make it worthwhile to haul huge gold dredges to this remote location.

On September 7, 2021 Jack in the Box released an ad campaign claiming to have purchased the town for 10,000 Cluck Chicken Sandwiches and a commemorative hat. The company explains on a website created for the campaign this was only an ad, but that the company has donated $10,000 to help the town amid the pandemic. However, as of September 2021 the downtown area of Chicken (not owned by Jack in the Box) was for sale, including the Chicken Creek Cafe, the Chicken Creek Saloon, a liquor store, a gas station, the Chicken Mercantile Emporium, and a 1400 sq. ft. residential cabin.

Geography

Chicken is accessible by air via Chicken Airport, and by road via Alaska Route 5, the Taylor Highway, which is not maintained from mid-October through mid-March.

Climate 

According to the Köppen Climate Classification system, Chicken has a dry-winter subarctic climate, abbreviated "Dwc" on climate maps.

Demographics

Chicken first appeared as an unincorporated village on the 1930 U.S. Census. It appeared on the 1940 and 1950 censuses, but then did not appear again until 1980, when the Census Bureau selected Chicken to be part of, and name-source for, a census-designated place (CDP). It was then abandoned as a CDP for a decade and the Census Bureau again did not publish the village-only population in 1990, but the CDP was re-established in 2000. Populations available for Chicken from 2000 onward include, therefore, residents of the entire CDP and not just the village proper.

Depictions in literature

The biographical novel Tisha: The Story of a Young Teacher in the Alaskan Wilderness, by Robert Specht, tells the story of Anne Hobbs, a white teacher in Chicken during the 1920s.

In The short story The Red Convertible, by Louise Erdrich, Henry and Lyman take a road trip from Montana to Chicken, Alaska.

References

External links

 Chickenstock Music Festival
 Chicken, Alaska official homepage

Census-designated places in Alaska
Census-designated places in Southeast Fairbanks Census Area, Alaska
Census-designated places in Unorganized Borough, Alaska
Mining communities in Alaska